Kristóf Korbély (born 26 May 2000) is a Hungarian football player who plays for Mosonmagyaróvár.

Career

Diósgyőr
On 20 April 2019, Korbély played his first match for Diósgyőr in a 1-0 win against Paks in the Hungarian League.

Club statistics

Updated to games played as of 16 December 2020.

References

External links

2000 births
People from Kazincbarcika
Sportspeople from Borsod-Abaúj-Zemplén County
Living people
Hungarian footballers
Hungary under-21 international footballers
Association football forwards
Diósgyőri VTK players
Kazincbarcikai SC footballers
Mosonmagyaróvári TE 1904 footballers
Nemzeti Bajnokság I players
Nemzeti Bajnokság II players